Mauritania is divided into 15 regions:

During the Mauritanian occupation of Western Sahara (1975–79), its portion of the territory (roughly corresponding to the lower half of Río de Oro province) was named Tiris al-Gharbiyya.

The regions are subdivided into 44 departments; see departments of Mauritania for more information.

See also
ISO 3166-2:MR

 
Mauritania 1
Regions, Mauritania
Mauritania, Regions
Mauritania geography-related lists
Subdivisions of Mauritania

Mauritania